Hapur Assembly constituency is one of the 403 constituencies of the Uttar Pradesh Legislative Assembly, India. It is a part of the Hapur district and one of the five assembly constituencies in the Meerut Lok Sabha constituency. First election in this assembly constituency was held in 1957 after the "DPACO (1956)" (delimitation order) was passed in 1956. After the "Delimitation of Parliamentary and Assembly Constituencies Order, 2008" was passed in 2008, the constituency was assigned identification number 59. During the 02nd Vidhan Sabha (1957-1962), this constituency was represented by two MLAs simultaneously.

The constituency is reserved for candidates from  scheduled caste community.

Wards / Areas
Extent of Hapur Assembly constituency is PCs Hapur, Sadikpur, Kharkhari, Bhatiyana, Chamri, Harsinghpur, Gondi, Asaura, Peernagar Soodna, Tatarpur, Dadayara, Doyami, Sirodhan, Hafizpur Ubarpur, Baroda Sihani, Dahana, Malakpur of Hapur KC, PCs Hirdaypur, Simrauli, Meerpur Kalan, Kathikhera, Sikanderpur Kakori, Ayadnagar Janoob, Hosdarpur Garhi, Lukhrara, Bachhlota, Nali Husainpur, Chhapkauli of Babugarh KC, Babugarh NP & Hapur MB of Hapur Tehsil.

Members of the Legislative Assembly

Election results

2022

2017

See also
Ghaziabad district, India
Meerut Lok Sabha constituency
Sixteenth Legislative Assembly of Uttar Pradesh
Uttar Pradesh Legislative Assembly

References

External links
 

Assembly constituencies of Uttar Pradesh
Hapur
Constituencies established in 1956
1956 establishments in Uttar Pradesh